The Central District of Chaharborj County is in West Azerbaijan province, Iran. At the National Census in 2006, the region's population (as a part of the former Marhemetabad District of Miandoab County) was 16,961 in 4,192 households. The following census in 2011 counted 18,975 people in 5,299 households. At the latest census in 2016, there were 19,552 inhabitants in 5,807 households. Marhemetabad District was separated from Miandoab County, elevated to the status of Chaharborj County, and divided into two districts in 2020.

References 

Districts of West Azerbaijan Province

Populated places in West Azerbaijan Province

fa:بخش مرکزی شهرستان چهاربرج